Maud Kaptheijns (born 28 September 1994) is a Dutch cyclist, who primarily competes in the cyclo-cross discipline of the sport. She won the gold medal in the under-23 event at the 2015 UEC European Cyclo-cross Championships after eventual winner Femke Van den Driessche was disqualified. She also won the bronze medal in the women's under-23 event at the 2016 UCI Cyclo-cross World Championships in Heusden-Zolder. Kaptheijns took her first UCI Cyclo-cross World Cup race win when she took victory in Duinencross Koksijde in October 2017.

Personal life
In September 2016 she announced that she was in a relationship with Belgian cyclist Laura Verdonschot.

Major results

2015–2016
 1st  UEC European Under-23 Championships
 Soudal Classics
2nd Hasselt
3rd Neerpelt
 2nd Boom
 3rd  UCI World Under-23 Championships
 3rd National Championships
 3rd Zonnebeke
 3rd Oostmalle
2016–2017
 DVV Trophy
1st Lille
2nd Hamme
 Brico Cross
2nd Kruibeke
 2nd Brabant
 3rd Oostmalle
 3rd Rucphen
 3rd Woerden
2017–2018
 UCI World Cup
1st Koksijde
 1st Brabant
 2nd Overall Superprestige
1st Gieten
1st Zonhoven
1st Boom
1st Ruddervoorde
2nd Hoogstraten
2nd Middelkerke
3rd Diegem
 Brico Cross
2nd Kruibeke
3rd Eeklo
 2nd National Championships
 2nd Oostmalle
 3rd Overall DVV Trophy
2nd Ronse
2nd Lille
3rd Baal
2018–2019
 Brico Cross
1st Essen
 UCI World Cup
3rd Pontchâteau
 3rd National Championships
2019–2020
 Ethias Cross
1st Eeklo
 1st Woerden
2021–2022
 1st Brumath
 1st Oisterwijk

References

External links
 
 

1994 births
Living people
Cyclo-cross cyclists
Dutch female cyclists
People from Veldhoven
Cyclists from North Brabant
Lesbian sportswomen
LGBT cyclists
Dutch LGBT sportspeople